WFC Rossiyanka was a Russian women's football club from Khimki.

History
The team was founded in 1990 as Nadezhda Krasnoarmeysk, being initially a futsal club. Futsal was played until 1998, when the club left it to concentrate in association football. Nadezhda played for two years in the second tier, attaining 5th and 3rd spots, before being disbanded at the end of the 2000 season, with most players moving to newly founded Nadezhda Noginsk.

In 2003 the team was back as Rossiyanka, attaining promotion to the Russian Championship in the first try. Rossiyanka won the 2005 and 2006 championships, preceded by a silver in its 2004 debut. From 2007 to 2009 the team was second to Zvezda Perm, before winning its third championship in 2010. Rossiyanka successfully defended the title in the following season, which ended in 2012 following a short-lived change in the calendar format.

After four seasons with no titles, Rossiyanka won its fifth championship in 2016. The following year most of its squad moved to CSKA Moscow and Rossiyanka was merged into CSKA following the end of the 2017 season. The vacant in the championship was filled by Lokomotiv Moscow.

Rossiyanka was a regular of the Champions League, where it has reached the quarter-finals in 2008 and 2012. As Russia ranks among the top 8 UEFA Leagues by coefficient, Rossiyanka entered the competition both as the Russian Championship's champion or vice-champion.

Titles

Official
 5 Russian Leagues: 2005, 2006, 2010, 2011–12, 2016
 5 Russian Cups: 2005, 2006, 2008, 2009, 2010

Invitational
 2 Albena Cups: 2005, 2006

Record in UEFA competitions

Current squad
As of 6 October 2016

Former international players
For details of current and former players, see :Category:WFC Rossiyanka players.

  Yael Averbuch
  Georgiana Birțoiu
  Tetyana Chorna
  Park Eun-sun
  Nadezhda Kharchenko
  Fabiana da Silva
  Cristiane de Souza
  Ester dos Santos
  Sofia Jacobsson
  Christina Julien
  Nompumelelo Nyandeni
  Aline Pellegrino
  Olga Petrova
  Natalia Russkikh
  Elena Schegaleva
  Natalia Shlyapina
  Tatyana Skotnikova
  Oksana Yakovyshyn
  Iryna Zvarych

See also
WFC CSKA

References

External links
 Official Website 
 Official Twitter profile 
 Club at UEFA.com

 
Women's football clubs in Russia
Khimki
1990 establishments in Russia
Association football clubs established in 2003
Association football clubs disestablished in 2017
2017 disestablishments in Russia
Defunct football clubs in Russia